Fabio Betancur Tirado (October 30, 1938 – November 20, 2011) was a Colombian ecclesiastic of the Catholic Church. He served as auxiliary bishop of Medellín, later became the first bishop of the diocese of La Dorada-Guaduas and later was archbishop of the archdiocese of Manizales, of which, once retired, he served as archbishop emeritus.

He was ordained a priest on September 6, 1964 in the chapel of the Major Seminary by the Archbishop of Medellín, Monsignor Tulio Botero Salazar. Betancur Tirado was named a bishop in 1982, resigning in 2010.

Notes

20th-century Roman Catholic archbishops in Colombia
1938 births
2011 deaths
21st-century Roman Catholic archbishops in Colombia
Roman Catholic bishops of La Dorada-Guaduas
Roman Catholic archbishops of Manizales
Roman Catholic bishops of Medellín